Prince Nikola of Yugoslavia (29 June 1928 – 12 April 1954), also known in Britain as Prince Nicholas and in Serbia as Nikola Karađorđević, was the younger son of Prince Paul of Yugoslavia by his wife Princess Olga of Greece and Denmark. 

Born in London, he died in a road accident in the UK.

Biography 

Known as "Nicky", he was educated in England at Oxford University and was a frequent social escort to Princess Margaret, sister of Queen Elizabeth II. The press often linked them romantically and speculated on a possible marriage between them.

Prince Nikola died unmarried in 1954, survived by his parents, Prince Paul and Princess Olga of Yugoslavia; older brother Prince Alexander and younger sister, Princess Elizabeth; also his maternal grandmother, Grand Duchess Elena Vladimirovna of Russia (Princess Nicholas of Greece and Denmark) and his maternal aunts, Princess Elizabeth, Countess of Toerring-Jettenbach, and Princess Marina, Duchess of Kent.

Death 
Nikola died in a road accident at Datchet, now in Berkshire, England, some five miles from the home of his aunt, the Duchess of Kent. He was
driving himself alone towards London, on his way to a meeting with Princess Margaret the same evening, to attend a full-dress rehearsal of a play being performed by a group of young socialites. His car was found overturned in a ditch by the side of the road, and he was injured but alive. He was taken to a hospital in Slough, but his life could not be saved.

His funeral service was held in London at the Serbian Orthodox Church on 17 April 1954, and his body was then sent for burial at the Bois-de-Vaux Cemetery, Lausanne, Switzerland. On 28 September 2012, his remains were exhumed from the cemetery in Lausanne and transferred to Serbia. Together with his parents, he was reburied in the Karađorđević family mausoleum in Oplenac, near Topola, on 6 October 2012.

Ancestry
He was a paternal grandson of Arsen Karađorđević, Prince of Serbia and Princess Aurora Pavlovna Demidova di San Donato. He was a maternal grandson of Prince Nicholas of Greece and Denmark and Grand Duchess Elena Vladimirovna of Russia.

References 

Nikola of Yugoslavia
English people of Serbian descent
Karađorđević dynasty
1928 births
1954 deaths
Alumni of the University of Oxford
English people of Finnish descent
English people of Swedish descent
English people of Russian descent
Serbian people of Russian descent
Yugoslav people of Russian descent
People from London
Serbian princes
English people of Greek descent
English people of German descent
English people of Danish descent
Serbian people of German descent
Serbian people of Greek descent
Burials at the Mausoleum of the Royal House of Karađorđević, Oplenac